Mike Kirkland may refer to:

Sportspeople
Mike Kirkland (American football) (born 1954), former American football quarterback
Mike Kirkland (coach), athletic director at Southwestern College in Winfield, Kansas
Mike Kirkland (rally driver) (born 1947), Kenyan rally driver

Musicians
Mike Kirkland, member of the folk singing group The Brothers Four, 1957–1969
Mike James Kirkland (born 1949), American R&B singer